Shoreview is a city in Ramsey County, Minnesota. The population was 25,043 at the time of the 2010 census. In 2008, Shoreview ranked fourth in a Family Circle list of best family towns.

Geography

A second-ring suburb north of Saint Paul, Shoreview has nine city parks and three county parks. It has seven lakes, of which the largest are Turtle Lake, Snail Lake, Lake Owasso, and Island Lake, and Rice Creek flows through the northwest portion of the city.

Interstate 35W, Interstate 694, and County Highway 96 are three of its main routes.

Demographics

According to a 2009 estimate, the median income for a household in the city was $78,990, and the median income for a family was $97,725. While 21% of households had incomes of $50,000.00 or less annually, 28% list incomes of over $100,000.00 per year. The per capita income for the city was $39,761. 2.5% of the population and 0.9% of families were below the poverty line. In 2000, males had a median income of $53,833 versus $36,565 for females. Out of the total population, 2.1% of those under the age of 18 and 3.6% of those 65 and older were living below the poverty line.

2010 census
As of the census of 2010, there were 25,043 people, 10,402 households, and 6,996 families living in the city. The racial makeup of the city was 87.4% White, 2.2% African American, 0.4% Native American, 7.2% Asian, 0.6% from other races, and 2.2% from two or more races. Hispanic or Latino of any race were 2.2% of the population.

There were 10,402 households, of which 28.5% had children under the age of 18 living with them, 56.5% were married couples living together, 7.9% had a female householder with no husband present, 2.8% had a male householder with no wife present, and 32.7% were non-families. 27.3% of all households were made up of individuals, and 9.7% had someone living alone who was 65 years of age or older. The average household size was 2.39 and the average family size was 2.92.

The median age in the city was 44.6 years. 21.6% of residents were under the age of 18; 7.2% were between the ages of 18 and 24; 21.8% were from 25 to 44; 35.1% were from 45 to 64; and 14.4% were 65 years of age or older. The gender makeup of the city was 47.9% male and 52.1% female.

2000 census
As of the census of 2000, there were 25,377 people, Males: 12,303 (48.5%), Females: 13,074 (51.5%), 9,965 households, and 7,021 families living in the city. The racial makeup of the city was 93.28% White, 1.01% African American, 0.22% Native American, 3.65% Asian, 0.05% Pacific Islander, 0.44% from other races, and 1.35% from two or more races. 1.33% of the population were Hispanic or Latino of any race. Ancestries: German (38.3%), Norwegian (15.9%), Swedish (13.9%), Irish (13.9%), English (8.3%), Polish (5.5%). Median resident age: 39.3 years

There were 9,965 households, out of which 34.6% had children under the age of 18 living with them, 60.3% were married couples living together, 7.9% had a female householder with no husband present, and 29.2% were non-families. 24.1% of all households were made up of individuals, and 6.5% had someone living alone who was 65 years of age or older. The average household size was 2.54 and the average family size was 3.06.

In the city, the population was spread out, with 26.2% under the age of 18, 6.9% from 18 to 24, 28.6% from 25 to 44, 28.6% from 45 to 64, and 9.7% who were 65 years of age or older. The median age was 39 years. For every 100 females, there were 94.0 males. For every 100 females age 18 and over, there were 90.3 males.

Education

Two public school districts provide educational services to Shoreview residents: District 621 (Mounds View) 
and District 623 (Roseville).

The following institutions are located in Shoreview:
 Island Lake Elementary School
 Snail Lake Education Center (Kindergarten only- feeds to Turtle Lake and Island Lake Elementary Schools)
 St. Odilia Catholic School and Church
 Turtle Lake Elementary School
 Oak Hill Montessori
 Emmet J Williams Elementary School

St. Odilia's, a private Catholic school, located next to Island Lake school, has a total enrollment of approximately 550 students in grades K–8.

Governance
The Shoreview City Council consists of a Mayor and four council members. The Mayor serves a two-year term of office, and the council members are elected at–large to serve overlapping four year terms. Shoreview has adopted the Plan B Council/Manager form of government, one of three forms permitted by the Minnesota State Legislature. The Council has policymaking and legislative authority and appoints the City Manager, who is charged with the administration of city business in accordance with council decisions. The Manager has the authority to appoint all employees and is responsible for the development of the annual budget.

Economy

Land O'Lakes has a corporate office in Shoreview.

Largest employers

Broadcasting operations
The majority of FM and television broadcasters in the Twin Cities area have their transmitters and antennae based in Shoreview;

WCCO (4), KTSP/KSTC (5 / 45), KARE (11), WUCW (23) and KPXM (41) transmit from this site, along with several other FM stations.

Shoreview made national headlines in September 1971 when a television tower on the site of the current Telefarm Towers collapsed during construction, killing seven workers.

Notable person
Madelyn Reiter, businesswoman and member of the Minnesota Senate

References

External links
 City of Shoreview
 Mounds View School District

Cities in Ramsey County, Minnesota
Cities in Minnesota